Aleksander Lukin is a fictional character appearing in American comic books published by Marvel Comics. The character first appeared in Captain America vol. 5 #1 (January 2005), and was created by Ed Brubaker and Steve Epting. He serves as the main antagonist of the first Winter Soldier storyline.

Fictional character biography
Aleksander Lukin was born in the Soviet village of Kronas some time in the late 1930s. His village was used as the Red Skull's base of operations during the Second World War. Soviet troops attempt to retake the town, assisted by the Western Allies' Invaders superhero team. The Soviet forces' leader Vasily Karpov takes Lukin under as a protege. 

In the ensuing decades, Lukin became an important figure in the Soviet military and the KGB, rising to the General rank. After Karpov's passing, Lukin is left in custody of a large cache of his mentor's special projects developed over the decades. He sells some of these devices to the highest bidders to raise funds, including to the Red Skull. Five years after later, the Red Skull finally recovers the reality-altering Cosmic Cube, only to be assassinated by the Winter Soldier on Lukin's orders. However, the Red Skull used the Cosmic Cube to transfer his own mind right before death into Lukin's body, leaving the two men stuck together "like rats in a cage". Lukin uses the Cosmic Cube to enrich his legitimate business front Kronas Corporation. But when, in a fit of rage, the Cosmic Cube harms one of his friends, Lukin has the Cosmic Cube sent away. After the Winter Soldier destroys the Cosmic Cube and regains his own memories, Lukin and the Red Skull have worked uneasily together against the original Captain America, even as the Red Skull wages a campaign for control of Lukin's body; Lukin vows to kill himself before allowing that to happen. Upon the Winter Soldier's discovery of Lukin's connection with the Red Skull, the two fake 'their' death to continue to operate from the shadows. With his former enforcer as Captain America, the pair contrive to abduct Sharon Carter to attach to a machine that will bring back the time-displaced Steve Rogers, however, their captive rebels and destroys the machine. Arnim Zola's last-ditch maneuver transfers the Red Skull's consciousness into a robot with Lukin free at last before being gunned down by Carter only a few seconds afterwards.

Lukin is later brought back from the dead by his wife Alexa Lukin, with the help of Rasputin and Selene. The Lukins join the Power Elite. As a side effect of his revival, the fragment of Red Skull's mind within Lukin was also revived.

In other media

Film
While Aleksander Lukin does not appear in the 2014 Marvel Cinematic Universe film Captain America: The Winter Soldier, Alexander Pierce (portrayed by Robert Redford) takes the character's place as the Winter Soldier's handler.

Video games
 The Kronas Corporation appears in Spider-Man: Web of Shadows. This version of the company serves as the Vulture's hideout, where he constructs armor for the Kingpin's forces.
 The Kronas Corporation appears in Lego Marvel Super Heroes.

References

External links
 Akelsander Lukin at Marvel Wiki

Characters created by Ed Brubaker
Comics characters introduced in 2004
Fictional businesspeople
Fictional generals
Fictional military strategists
Fictional Russian people
Marvel Comics supervillains